Major Powell frequently refers to American Civil War brevet lieutenant colonel for the Union John Wesley Powell (1834–1902), U.S. geologist and geographer.

Major Powell (MAJ Powell) may also refer to:

People
 Colonel Powell (disambiguation), any of several colonels named Powell who rose through the rank of Major into colonelcy or lieutenantcolonelship
 General Powell (disambiguation), any of several generals named Powell who rose through the rank of Major to become General Officers

 E. Alexander Powell (1879–1957), U.S. military war correspondent, journalist and author
 Geoffrey Powell (20th century), British Army major, and WWII commander of 156 Para battalion of 4th Parachute Brigade (United Kingdom)
 Vernon Harcourt De Butts Powell (died 1918) WW1 Canadian major, recipient of the Military Cross for gallantry under fire, namesake of Powell's House at Appleby College

Other uses
 , a 19th-century Colorado River screw-driven steam-powered riverboat named for John Wesley Powell

See also

 Percy Powell-Cotton (1866–1980), British Army major and explorer
 Sergeant-Major Powell, a participant in the Battle of Santo Domingo (1586)
 
 
 Powell (disambiguation)
 Major (disambiguation)